Wheatcroft may refer to:

People
 Chris Wheatcroft, British piano player
 Geoffrey Wheatcroft (born 1945), British journalist and writer
 Georgina Wheatcroft (born 1965), Canadian curler
 Harry Wheatcroft (1898–1977), English rose grower
 John Wheatcroft (1925–2017), American writer
 Patience Wheatcroft, Baroness Wheatcroft (born 1951), British journalist
 Stephen G. Wheatcroft (born 1947), Australian historian
 Tom Wheatcroft (1922–2009), English businessman
 Freddie Wheatcroft (1882–1917), English footballer
 George Wheatcroft (1799–1860), English cricketer
 George Wheatcroft (1905–1987), English chess player
 Kevin Wheatcroft (born 1959), British businessman and motor sport entrepreneur
 Nelson Wheatcroft (1852–1897)
 Paul Wheatcroft (born 1980), English footballer
 Steve Wheatcroft (born 1978), American golfer.
 William Wheatcroft (died 1550s), English politician

Places
 Wheatcroft, Derbyshire, England
 Wheatcroft, Kentucky, United States

Sport

 Wheatcroft Racing, a racing team
 Wheatcroft (racing car), a racing car